Jamila E. Taylor (born December 9, 1975) is an American attorney, activist, and politician who is a representative for District 30 in the Washington House of Representatives. Elected in 2020, she assumed office on January 11, 2021.

Early life and education 
Jamila Taylor was born on December 9, 1975. She is the only daughter of Quintard Taylor Jr. and his wife Carolyn. Taylor has a twin brother, William, and another brother, Quintard III. Taylor earned a Bachelor of Arts degree from Virginia State University and a Juris Doctor from the University of Oregon School of Law.

Career 
Since graduating from law school, Taylor has worked as a public interest attorney and owner of the NW Prosper Law.

Prior to her campaign for the Washington House, Taylor was a candidate for the Federal Way, Washington City Council in 2019, and was one of three nominees of the 30th Legislative District Democrats to be appointed to the seat of former representative Kristine Reeves. After Mike Pellicciotti announced that he would not seek re-election to the Washington House of Representatives and instead run for Washington State Treasurer, Taylor declared her candidacy to succeed him. Taylor placed first in the August 2020 Democratic primary and defeated Republican nominee Martin Moore in the November general election. She assumed office on January 11, 2021.

Electoral history

References 

1975 births
Living people
African-American state legislators in Washington (state)
Democratic Party members of the Washington House of Representatives
Virginia State University alumni
University of Oregon School of Law alumni
People from Federal Way, Washington
Washington (state) lawyers
21st-century African-American politicians
21st-century American politicians
20th-century African-American women
21st-century American women politicians
21st-century African-American women
Women state legislators in Washington (state)
African-American women in politics
American twins
21st-century American women lawyers
21st-century American lawyers
African-American women lawyers